Anne-Grete (born 1947) is a Danish singer. It may also refer to:

 Anne Grete Hollup (born 1957), Norwegian writer
 Anne Grete Holmsgaard (born 1948), Danish politician
 Anne Grete Preus (1957–2019), Norwegian rock singer
 Anne-Grete Strøm-Erichsen (born 1949), Norwegian politician